Formula Mazda is a class of relatively affordable open wheel formula racing.

Formula Mazda has its own class in SCCA club racing, and there is a North American professional series called the Indy Pro 2000 Championship (formerly the Pro Mazda Championship) that is part of IndyCar's Road to Indy ladder system. The cars are very popular; seeing a field of 40 or more cars at a race is quite common. Many drivers aspiring to the top classes of racing use the pro series to hone and demonstrate their talent. In 2006, the 2004 Formula Mazda champion, Michael McDowell, drove in the American Champ Car series, and Scott Speed, won in Formula Mazda in 2002.

In terms of both cost and performance, Formula Mazda lies between Formula Ford and Formula Atlantic, that is, close to a Formula Three and a Formula Renault 2.0. A full season in the professional Star Mazda series costs around US$200,000 – US$300,000 in 2005.

Original car – Formula Mazda
The series originally grew out of five chassis built by Hayashi in Japan for the Jim Russell Racing Drivers School in California, USA.  Twenty-five cars were built by Marc Bahner, Bahner Engineering, Calif., for the 1984 Long Beach Grand Prix, where the cars made their US debut. The majority of these cars were purchased by owner/operators.  The original five chassis remained with the Russell School.  The cars have a basic welded steel tube frame chassis, with in-board front shocks operated by upper rocker arms. A 180 hp carbureted Mazda rotary engine drives through a 5 speed H-pattern (H-gate) Hewland Mk 9 transaxle. Rear suspension is by two trailing links, an upper link and a lower a-arm. In the interest of creating close racing and limiting cost, the rules state that no modification is allowed until the rules expressly permit it—at one time even replacing the mirrors on the car was prohibited. The engines cannot be modified, and they are sealed to make it easy to detect cheating. The cars all use the same tires, springs, dampers, and adjustable anti-roll bars.

In September 2009, Moses Smith Racing, LLC. (MSR), headquartered at the time in Tempe, AZ, took over all support and manufacturing rights for the approximately 300 Formula Mazda rotary-powered race cars currently in use across North America, as well as the MSR sports racer, a full-bodied version of the FM.  MSR has since moved to a new location at MotorSport Ranch (a country club style race track facility) in Cresson, TX.  Moses Smith also owns and operates Texas Autosports, a full service Formula Mazda Racecar prep shop located at Motorsport Ranch in Cresson, TX.  It is essentially the one-stop shop for Formula Mazda Racing.  Moses Smith Racing, the manufacturer of the Formula Mazda, as well as Texas Autosports, both owned by Moses Smith are operating out of an 8000+ square foot facility at what is affectionately dubbed 'The Ranch'.

New car – Pro Formula Mazda
In 2004, a completely new car was introduced for the Pro series. It features a carbon fiber chassis, 6 speed sequential gearbox, and a sealed 250 hp fuel-injected Renesis engine very similar to the one in the Mazda RX-8. The MoTeC ECU uses input from the gearshift to enable upshifting while the driver holds the throttle wide open. The ECU also provides traction control which the driver can turn off from inside the car. The rules allow a choice among five different spring rates at each corner, and the new Öhlins dampers offer separate bump and rebound adjustments. The driver can adjust the front anti-roll bar from the cockpit.

The new car is substantially faster than the older car, usually lapping about 3 seconds faster per mile of track, but the original car remains legal for SCCA club racing.

End as a separate class
For 2020, Formula Mazda class was eliminated by the SCCA and replaced by Formula X, which is not a spec class and allows other cars of similar speed including Formula 4 and older U.S. F2000 National Championship cars not eligible for Formula Continental. In its first SCCA Runoffs, 11 of the 12 Formula X entries were Formula Mazda cars.

Formula Mazda at the SCCA National Championship Runoffs

External links

Formula Mazda Challenge presented by Goodyear
Pro Mazda Championship official website
Mazda Racers – The Mazda Racing Community
Formula Mazda
Texas Autosports

Mazda
Mazda 
Mazda
One-make series
Sports Car Club of America